Abu’l Fath of Sarmin was the Nizari Ismaili Emir of Apamea after the assassination of Khalaf ibn Mula’ib in 1106.  He enlisted help from Ridwan to counter the threat from Tancred.  Tancred, with help from Khalaf’s son Musbih ibn Mula’ib, captured the town.  Abu’l Fath, without allies among the neighboring emirs, negotiated the safe passage of the Muslims in the town.  Nevertheless, he and three of his followers were put to death.  Apamean nobles were then taken to Antioch to be ransomed by Ridwan.

References 
Runciman, Steven, A History of the Crusades, Volume Two:  The Kingdom of Jerusalem and the Frankish East, 1100-1187, Cambridge University Press, London, 1952, pgs. 52-3

Ibn al-Qalanisi, Gibb, H. A. R., The Damascus Chronicle of the Crusades: Extracted and Translated from the Chronicle of Ibn Al-Qalanisi (2nd ed.), Courier, 2002, pgs. 73-4

12th-century Syrian people
12th-century murdered monarchs
Apamea, Syria
11th-century Arabs
12th-century Arabs
Nizari Ismaili state
Muslims of the Crusades
People of the Nizari–Seljuk wars
12th-century Ismailis
11th-century Syrian people